Kratos (  "strength"; Old Norse: Fárbauti   "cruel striker") is a fictional character and the protagonist of Santa Monica Studio's God of War series, based on Greek mythology and, later, Norse mythology. He first appeared in the 2005 video game God of War, which led to the development of eight additional titles featuring the character as the protagonist. Kratos also appears as the protagonist of the 2010 and 2018 comic series, as well as three novels that retell the events of three of the games. The character was voiced by Terrence C. Carson from 2005 to 2013, with Christopher Judge taking over the role in 2018's continuation, also titled God of War. Antony Del Rio voiced the character as a child in God of War: Ghost of Sparta.

Throughout the Greek era of the series, Kratos is portrayed as a Spartan warrior, who becomes known as the "Ghost of Sparta" after accidentally killing his family due to the trickery of his former mentor Ares, the God of War. He later avenges the deaths of his family and becomes the new "God of War" after killing Ares. Kratos is eventually revealed to be a demigod and the son of Zeus, who later betrays him. Kratos embarks on several adventures in attempts to avert disaster or to change his fate. He is usually portrayed as being oblivious to all else and is stoic, bloodthirsty, and arrogant in nature, often engaging in morally ambiguous activities and performing acts of extreme violence. However, he frequently questions himself, undergoes bouts of severe guilt and self-hate, even attempting suicide several times, and is generally portrayed as a tragic figure. Vengeance is a central theme of the Greek era, and installments focus on Kratos' origins and his relationships with his family and the Olympian gods. In the Norse era of the series, Kratos finds himself controlling his rage and learning how to truly be a father and mentor to his son, Atreus, helping him come to terms with his divinity. Along their journey, they combat monsters and gods of the Norse realm, of whom they make enemies, which inevitably leads to the catastrophic battle of Ragnarök.

The God of War franchise is a flagship title for the PlayStation brand and Kratos is one of its most popular characters. The character has been well received by critics and has become a video game icon, a relative newcomer among more established franchise characters, such as Mario, Link, Sonic the Hedgehog, Lara Croft and Crash Bandicoot. The character is now associated with other products and has had various cameos in PlayStation games outside of the God of War series.

Concept and design
In designing Kratos, God of War (2005) creator and game director David Jaffe attempted to create a character that looked brutal, but did not resemble a typical traditional Greek hero. The character would not wear traditional armor as Jaffe wanted him to be individualistic. Although the idea of using a fully masked character was approved, the concept was abandoned as the design seemed soulless and lacked a defined personality. Some models included unconventional elements, such as portraying him carrying an infant on his back, while others had excessive detail, such as hair and other "flowing things".

Charlie Wen, director of visual development on God of War (2005) and God of War II, was responsible for designing Kratos. Wen said that his direction for designing Kratos was as much influenced by similarly themed films as it was by pop culture, which led him to conceive Kratos on a series of napkins at a restaurant, having forgotten his sketchbook, introducing the idea of the double-chained blades and eventually Kratos' iconic design. Double-chained blades were chosen as Kratos' signature weapon because they emphasized the character's animal nature while also allowing combat to remain fluid. Wen visualized the double-chained blades activating simultaneously as Kratos threw them with a balance of ferocity and accuracy. Jaffe said of the final version of the character, "[Kratos] may not totally feel at home in Ancient Greece from a costume standpoint, I think he achieves the greater purpose which is to give players a character who they can play who really does just let them go nuts and unleash the nasty fantasies that they have in their head."

Wen gave Kratos his most noticeable feature, his ash-white complexion, a story development that earns him the title "Ghost of Sparta." Other distinctive features include a scar across his right eye, and a large, red tattoo that threads from his left eye, circles his left torso, and ends at his left shoulder. The tattoo was originally blue, but was changed late in production. In the series lore, the scar is eventually revealed to be the result of a childhood encounter with the Olympian God, Ares, while the tattoo is a tribute to his dead brother Deimos, who had similar birth markings. Other changes that occur during the course of the Greek era of the series include the temporary addition of divine armor when Kratos is the God of War, an abdominal scar, ability-enhancing armor such as an epaulet called the Golden Fleece (all God of War II), and the Boots of Hermes (God of War III). In 2018's God of War, the designers gave Kratos a more Nordic look, including a full beard. They also changed his main weapon to a magical battle axe to make the combat more grounded. Unlike previous games, players can change and upgrade Kratos' three different armor pieces, one of the game's various RPG elements.

Kratos' appearance throughout the Greek games can be altered in bonus play; completing the game at certain levels of difficulty and in challenge modes unlock bonus costumes. Several costumes were available exclusively via pre-order and other promotions (e.g. God of War III, which features three costumes based on early sketches of the character) from the PlayStation Store. Although many bonus costumes are consistent with story themes, others are humorous or farcical—such as the female costume "Athena" and the "Spud of War".

The character was given his name at a late stage in the development of the original game after the character had already been fleshed out. Unaware of the actual mythological god named Kratos appearing in Prometheus Bound, the creators coincidentally chose Kratos, the same Greek word meaning "Strength", of which the mythological figure is the personification. Stig Asmussen, who worked on the first two games and was game director of God of War III, called the naming coincidence a "happy mistake", noting that the Kratos in the game and the one in Prometheus Bound are both "pawns". Zoran Iovanovici of California State University, Long Beach observed with irony that, while the mythological Kratos is best known for chaining Prometheus, in God of War II, the video game character releases him. Classical scholar Sylwia Chmielewski states that the video game character Kratos draws extensively on other figures from Greek mythology, including the heroes Perseus, Theseus, and Achilles, but his strongest influence is the hero Heracles (Roman Hercules), who appears in God of War III with the Romanized name and is the character's half-brother.

For 2018's God of War, game director Cory Barlog explained that Kratos had to change his cycle of violence and learn how to control his rage. He said that Kratos had made many bad decisions, which led to the destruction of Olympus, and wanted to know what would happen if Kratos made a good decision. The birth of Barlog's own son influenced the idea of Kratos' character change. The canceled live-action Star Wars television series was also an influence. The bond between Kratos and his son is at the heart of the game and Barlog said "This game is about Kratos teaching his son how to be a god, and his son teaching Kratos how to be human again." Referencing the Marvel Comics character Hulk, Barlog said that in regards to Kratos, "We've already told the story of The Hulk. We want to tell the story of [Bruce] Banner now."

Voice and actor portrayal
Christopher Judge, best known as Teal'c from Stargate SG-1, replaced T.C. Carson as the voice of Kratos in the 2018 game; Carson had voiced Kratos since the original God of War. Commenting in response to the change, Carson said, "Sony went in a new direction." In explaining the actor change, Barlog said that the way the previous games were made, they were able to have someone else do the motion capture instead of the voice actor. Although Carson had done the motion capture for Kratos in Ascension, Barlog said the actor change was made because of the type of camera work they wanted to do. For the new camera work, they needed someone who was closer to Kratos' size to do the motion capture along with 10-year-old Sunny Suljic, who played Kratos' son Atreus. Carson was unsuitable for this because he was much shorter than Kratos, who is over 6-feet tall: "Offsetting [Carson's height] for the size of a child, it turned out it was going to be almost impossible to try and actually shoot them and go in and redo the animations." Judge was chosen because he was 6-foot-3 and had the body of a professional football player. In stepping into the role of Kratos, Judge took it as an opportunity to add something new to the character. He researched the character and Carson's performance but decided not to imitate it. Since Santa Monica was going in a new direction, he decided to start fresh.

Prior to beginning work on Ragnarök, Judge briefly quit the game after finding out that Eric Williams would be directing the sequel. Judge was uncertain about Williams; however, Barlog, who served as a producer and creative director on Ragnarök, was able to convince Judge that Williams was fully capable of directing the game, which Judge affirmed after working with him.

Role in the God of War series

Greek era

Backstory and comics (past)

Throughout the series, Kratos is portrayed as an antihero, often performing questionable actions. Although his backstory is seen in the original God of War, Kratos' childhood is revealed in Ghost of Sparta and the birth of his daughter is explored in the God of War comic series (2010–11). In Ghost of Sparta, it is revealed that the oracle had foretold that the demise of Olympus would not happen by the hands of the Titans—imprisoned after the Great War—but rather by a mortal, a marked warrior. The Olympians Zeus, Athena, and Ares believed this warrior to be Deimos, Kratos' younger brother, who had a strange birthmark. Ares and Athena interrupted the childhood training of Kratos and Deimos in Sparta and kidnapped Deimos. Kratos attempted to stop Ares, but Ares swept him aside and scarred him across his right eye. Taken to Death's Domain, Deimos was imprisoned and tortured for many years by the god of death, Thanatos. Believing Deimos to be dead, Kratos marked himself with a red tattoo, identical to his brother's birthmark, to honor his siblings.

Through flashbacks in the comic series (2010–11) written by Marv Wolfman, Kratos meets his wife Lysandra and they have a daughter named Calliope. Upon birth, Calliope was stricken with the plague. In order to save his daughter, Kratos was granted a quest to find the Ambrosia of Asclepius, an elixir with magical healing properties. Five of the gods entered into a wager with Ares: each chose a champion to search for the Ambrosia with Ares' champion being Kratos. Kratos overcame all obstacles, including, among others, Hades' champion, the Barbarian Prince Alrik who eventually became the Barbarian King, and thus Kratos saved his daughter.

Via flashbacks in God of War, it is revealed that Kratos became the youngest captain of Sparta's army (also shown in the 2010–11 comic series), but had a thirst for power. When Kratos was faced with total defeat at the hands of a barbarian horde led by the Barbarian King, the Spartan called to the Olympian god Ares for aid. Kratos was given the Blades of Chaos, destroyed his enemies, and blindly followed Ares, killing hundreds in his name. After Ares tricked Kratos into murdering his wife Lysandra and daughter Calliope in a temple dedicated to Athena, the Spartan was shocked out of his bloodlust and renounced service to Ares. As the temple burned, a village oracle cursed Kratos and condemned him to wear the "mark of his terrible deed"; the ashes of his family, which turn his skin pale white, earning him the title "Ghost of Sparta".

Ascension, Chains of Olympus, and God of War (2005)

In Ascension, it is revealed that because Kratos renounced Ares and broke his blood oath to the god, Kratos was imprisoned and tortured by the three Furies. He was helped by the oath keeper Orkos and eventually overcame and killed the Furies. In order to completely be free of Ares' oath, Kratos was forced to kill Orkos, who begged Kratos to do so. Although free of his oath to the god, he was flooded with memories of killing his family. He then vowed to serve the other gods in order to receive forgiveness and relief from the nightmares of his past deeds, but he was openly defiant.

In Chains of Olympus, Kratos was reluctant to help the gods when Helios was kidnapped, and openly abandoned them when Persephone offered him a chance to be reunited with his daughter. Kratos, however, was forced to reverse his decision when Persephone used the Titan Atlas in a bid to destroy the world and in turn, the spirit of Calliope. Knowing that while intervention would save Calliope, it would separate him from his family forever, a bitter Kratos killed Persephone, imprisoned Atlas, and freed Helios.

By the time of God of War, Kratos had been serving the gods for ten years and had grown tired of his service and nightmares. When he confronted his patron Athena, she advised him that if he killed the rampaging Ares, the gods would forgive his sins. With this selfish motive, he again agreed, and after finding and using Pandora's Box, he was successful. Despite being freed of Ares' influence, including the Blades of Chaos, Kratos was forgiven but was not relieved of his nightmares. A dissatisfied and despairing Kratos tried to commit suicide but was saved by Athena, who guided him to Olympus. Awarded the Blades of Athena, Kratos became the new God of War.

Comics (present), Ghost of Sparta, and Betrayal

The comic series (2010–11) also shows Kratos' present search for the Ambrosia of Asclepius. This time, he plans to destroy the Ambrosia to prevent the worshipers of Ares from resurrecting their former master. In this quest, Kratos overcame several enemies, including the Chaos Giant Gyges, before destroying the Ambrosia. Still haunted by the visions of his mortal past in Ghost of Sparta, and against the advice of Athena, Kratos embarked on a quest to find his mother, Callisto, in the city of Atlantis. Callisto attempted to reveal the identity of Kratos' father before being transformed against her will into a beast that Kratos was forced to kill. Before dying, Callisto advised Kratos to search for his brother Deimos in Sparta. Kratos first freed the Titan Thera from imprisonment, which caused the destruction of Atlantis, earning him the wrath of Poseidon. In Sparta, Kratos learned of Deimos' location: the Domain of Death. He found and freed Deimos, who remained hostile toward his brother. After a skirmish between the siblings, Thanatos attacked Deimos, but after being rescued by Kratos, the pair joined forces to battle their foe. At this point, Thanatos realizes Ares, Athena, and Zeus chose the wrong Spartan; it was Kratos who should have been taken, the "mark" being his red tattoo and his skin turned white from his family's ashes. Although Thanatos killed Deimos, the god was in turn killed by Kratos. Kratos then returned to Olympus, enraged at the gods. In Betrayal, Kratos had been shunned by the other gods and decided to lead his Spartan army to overrun Greece. He was falsely accused of murdering Argos, and he killed Ceryx, the son of Hermes, for interfering in his search for the true assassin, who escaped.

God of War II

Kratos then joined the Spartan army in Rhodes, intent on destruction. Zeus, however, weakened Kratos and tricked him into abandoning his godly powers into the Blade of Olympus, which Zeus used to kill Kratos. Although he overcame all obstacles, Kratos was stunned at Zeus's betrayal and swore revenge as he died. Kratos fell into the Underworld, but was rescued by Gaia. Banished to Tartarus with the other surviving Titans after the First Great War, Gaia and her brethren seek the death of Zeus. Kratos, fueled by anger at his betrayal, agreed to aid the Titans and was instructed to find the Sisters of Fate, who are capable of returning him to the moment of Zeus' treachery. Kratos became determined and utterly ruthless—in the pursuit of his goal, he wounded a Titan, killed several Greek heroes without hesitation, and deliberately sacrificed two scholars, and restoring himself his god-powers. All three of the Sisters of Fate were killed when they opposed Kratos, who was prepared to kill Zeus in a final confrontation. Zeus was only saved when Athena intervened and sacrificed herself for him; only then does Kratos show remorse. He learned from a dying Athena that Zeus is, in fact, his father, a fact Zeus kept secret because he wished to avoid a repetition of what he did to his own father, Cronos. Kratos rejected any notion of a relationship and vowed to kill Zeus and destroy Olympus. Encouraged by Gaia, Kratos used the power of the Fates to retrieve the Titans before their defeat in the Great War, and with their assistance, stormed Mount Olympus.

God of War III

Although Kratos killed Poseidon, he was abandoned by Gaia when his first encounter with Zeus went poorly. Stranded in the Underworld and now betrayed by both the Olympians and Titans, Kratos learned from the spirit of Athena, who also provided the Blades of Exile, that he needed to find the Flame of Olympus, which is the key to defeating Zeus. Kratos murdered both Titans and gods, ignoring the warnings of his victims as he sought the Flame. Realizing the key to pacifying the Flame and reaching Pandora's Box (engulfed by the Flame) is Pandora herself, Kratos came to care for Pandora, who reminded him of his lost daughter Calliope. Kratos showed humanity when he attempted to stop Pandora from sacrificing herself to quench the Flame, but reluctantly allowed the act when she said there was no other option, ultimately being provoked into doing so by Zeus after the latter stated that Kratos would fail her like he failed his own family, causing Kratos to let her go and attack Zeus in a fit of rage. Finding the box empty, and driven berserk by Zeus' mockery, Kratos engaged his father in another fierce battle. Although Gaia interrupted and tried to kill Kratos and Zeus, she was destroyed by Kratos, who then apparently defeated Zeus. Zeus returned in spirit form and attacked Kratos, who retreated into his psyche. Kratos forgave himself for his past sins with the help of Pandora. Pandora later appeared and told Kratos that hope would save him. Kratos was revived and easily destroyed Zeus. Athena confronted Kratos and demanded that he return the power of hope; the contents of Pandora's Box. In a selfless act, Kratos refused, stated his need for vengeance was gone and impaled himself with the Blade of Olympus, which dispersed the power across the world for mankind's use. Athena, disappointed with Kratos, removed the Blade and departed as Kratos collapsed next to the Blade of Olympus. The post-credits scene showed a trail of blood leading away from the Blade with Kratos' whereabouts unknown.

Norse Era

God of War (2018)

Many years after the events of God of War III, Kratos, having survived his apparent death from releasing the power of Hope in Greece, ended up in ancient Scandinavia in the Norse realm of Midgard and fathered a young son named Atreus, who is unaware of his true nature. Kratos has abandoned his double-chained blades as a symbolism of abandoning his old persona; instead, he uses a battle axe called the Leviathan Axe that originally belonged to his second wife and Atreus' mother Laufey (called Faye by Kratos), who recently passed. Her last wish was for her ashes to be spread at the highest peak of the nine realms. At Midgard's peak, they learn from Mímir that the highest peak is actually in Jötunheim. Along their journey, they are confronted by the Æsir god Baldur, the brother of Thor whose sons Modi and Magni assist their uncle, but are killed by Kratos and Atreus. Around this time, Atreus falls ill. To cure him, Kratos must recover his old weapons, the Blades of Chaos, in order to battle the beings of Helheim as the Leviathan Axe is useless there as it inflicts frost damage. While retrieving the blades, Athena appears and goads him about his past. Kratos journeys to Hel and retrieves the cure by killing the troll that guards the realm. After curing him, Kratos reveals to Atreus that he is a god. The pair also receive assistance from a witch, later revealed to be the Vanir goddess Freya, the mother of Baldur who had cast a spell of immortality on Baldur which protects him, but also causes him to no longer feel anything physically, which he resented her for. Kratos and Baldur eventually battle, during which, Baldur's spell is broken. Kratos decides to let Baldur go, but Baldur attempts to kill Freya, forcing Kratos to kill him. Freya swears revenge against Kratos for killing her son and taunts Kratos for not revealing his troubled past to Atreus. Kratos decides to tell Atreus that he had killed his fellow Greek gods, including his father Zeus (whose illusion he saw in Helheim), but he and Atreus should learn from these experiences and not repeat past mistakes. The two then make their way to Jötunheim, where it is learned that Faye was actually a giant, also making Atreus part-giant. It is also revealed that Faye originally wanted to name their son Loki, but Kratos preferred Atreus, which was the name of an honorable Spartan comrade. The giants also referred to Kratos as Fárbauti. In Midgard, Fimbulwinter began, and after sleeping in the family home, Atreus has a vision that Thor will come for them at the end of Fimbulwinter.

God of War Ragnarök

Taking place three years after events of the previous game, Kratos, Atreus, and Mímir are confronted by the Allfather Odin and the God of Thunder Thor towards the end of Fimbulwinter. After dueling Thor, Kratos, Atreus, and Mímir set out on a journey across the nine realms in hopes of finding a way to prevent Ragnarök. Along the way, they are confronted by a vengeful Freya, but they eventually make amends. Unable to prevent Ragnarök, Kratos, Atreus, and their allies unite the realms in a war against Asgard. Kratos battles Thor once again, but Thor is killed by Odin for refusing to kill Kratos. Kratos, Atreus, Mímir, and Freya then engage Odin in battle and defeat the Allfather as Asgard is destroyed. Returning home to Midgard, Atreus, as Loki, decides that he needs to go and find any remaining Giants and bids a heartfelt farewell while Kratos learns that he is destined to become a revered god and along with Freya and Mímir, begins rebuilding the realms and restore peace.

Other appearances

Guest appearances
Both the Greek and Norse versions of Kratos have been featured as a playable character in several PlayStation games outside of the God of War series. On August 21, 2008, Kratos was released as a downloadable character in Hot Shots Golf: Out of Bounds along with his Clubs of Chaos. As a pre-order bonus for LittleBigPlanet from GameStop, customers received a Sackboy Kratos costume along with ones for Medusa and a Minotaur, as well as a God of War level sticker kit. These were later released for purchase on January 26, 2009. Kratos was then a guest character in 2009's Soulcalibur: Broken Destiny, which includes his own story mode. As a pre-order bonus for ModNation Racers from GameStop, customers received a Kratos Mod along with his Kart of Chaos. These were later released for purchase on November 2, 2010. Kratos' next guest appearance was in the PlayStation 3 version of 2011's Mortal Kombat (and the PlayStation Vita version released in 2012), which features his own fighting stage and arcade ladder mode. The character then appeared in the 2012 crossover fighting game, PlayStation All-Stars Battle Royale, which includes two God of War inspired stages, several God of War items, as well as series antagonist Zeus, who was released as a downloadable character on March 19, 2013. Kratos' appearance in PlayStation All-Stars Battle Royale was seemingly made canon by a line of dialogue in 2022's God of War Ragnarök; Mímir asked Kratos about a tournament he was in to which Kratos replied that he did not want to talk about it.

As part of the God of War franchise's tenth anniversary, Kratos appeared as a secret boss battle in the PlayStation 3, PlayStation 4, and PlayStation Vita versions of Shovel Knight, released April 21, 2015. His next guest appearance brought him back to the world of LittleBigPlanet in LittleBigPlanet 3 as another Sackboy costume, this time in his Fear Kratos form, along with Sackboy costumes of Zeus, Hercules, Poseidon, and Athena, and a costume of Hades for the character Toggle. The costumes' release coincided with that of God of War III Remastered on PlayStation 4 in July 2015. A costume of Kratos as well as God of War custom decorations were included in the "Crafted Edition" of Tearaway Unfolded, which released on PlayStation 4 on September 8, 2015. TC Carson provided Kratos' voice in all of these guest appearances, except for LittleBigPlanet, ModNation Racers, LittleBigPlanet 3, and Tearaway Unfolded where the character is only a costume, and in Shovel Knight which only has text dialogue.

The character has been parodied twice in The Simpsons franchise. He appeared as the "God of Wharf" on a billboard advertising a chowder restaurant in The Simpsons Game. He later appeared on the Guts of War II: Entrails of Intestinox kiosk at "E4"—a parody of the Electronic Entertainment Expo (E3)—in The Simpsons television episode, "The Food Wife". Kratos has also been parodied by Adult Swim's clay-mation television series, Robot Chicken. He was first parodied in season 5, episode 15, "The Core, The Thief, His Wife and Her Lover", where it is shown how far Kratos (voiced by Brian Austin Green) will go to collect blood orbs. Sony later teamed up with Robot Chicken to produce a marketing campaign advertisement for PlayStation All-Stars Battle Royale that parodied Kratos and other characters from the game.

In the PlayStation 5 launch game Astro's Playroom, which contains several homages to PlayStation's history, a couple of robots dressed as Kratos and Atreus are seen reenacting the two traveling in their boat in 2018's God of War. The Nordic Kratos then became a cosmetic outfit in Fortnite Battle Royales chapter two, season five event, Zero Point, which released on December 3, 2020. Kratos is playable on all platforms that Fortnite is available on, marking the character's only appearance on the Xbox and Nintendo platforms as well as Apple and Android devices; these platforms, including Microsoft Windows, have Kratos' default style, while players on the PlayStation versions get an exclusive armored Kratos style, based on the golden armor obtained from defeating the Valkyries in 2018's God of War. There is also an armor inspired by Kratos that is obtainable in the Director's Cut of Ghost of Tsushima, which released on August 20, 2021, for the PlayStation 4 and PlayStation 5. The top half of the armor and helmet is ash-white like Kratos' skin and also features his red tattoo, while the rest of the armor looks similar to Kratos' Nordic gear, including chains wrapped around the forearms. Returning to the world of LittleBigPlanet, costumes of the Nordic Kratos, along with Atreus and Freya, as well as emotes for each, were released for Sackboy: A Big Adventure on November 9, 2022, the same day as God of War Ragnaröks release.

Others
Kratos is also the main character in novelizations of the game series by Matthew Stover, Robert E. Vardeman, and James M. Barlog. The novels are a retelling of the games and offer deeper insights into their stories. The first novel was written by Stover and Vardeman together, titled God of War, and was published in May 2010. The second was written solely by Vardeman, titled God of War II, and was published in February 2013. The third novel, titled God of War – The Official Novelization, was written by Barlog and released in August 2018—this novelization is of 2018's God of War, skipping a novelization of God of War III.

A film adaptation of the original God of War was announced in 2005. Although pre-production saw new writers get hired to adapt the game, it remained in development hell. Following the release of 2018's God of War, rumors about a potential adaptation of that game began circulating. In May 2021, however, a Sony spokesperson confirmed that there was no film adaptation for any God of War in development, but in May 2022, it was announced that a streaming television series adaptation was in development for Amazon Prime Video, adapting the Norse era, beginning with the events of the 2018 installment.

Cultural impact

Reception

Kratos' character has received a positive response from video game publications. GameSpot regarded Kratos as a "sympathetic antihero" and a "badass", and described him as endearing due to his unforgiving demeanor, but added that the slowly-developing story offered players "no understanding [of him]" in the game's early stages. IGN said he was ruthless, merciless and savage, noting the character's main motive is vengeance and "all he desires is murder." IGN also stated that in time the player would begin to "love and loathe Kratos and hate Ares." GamePro said it was "Kratos' tragic fall and brutal ascension to the peaks of Mount Olympus that made the original God of War so memorable." PlayStation Universe said he was "certainly a unique character and a warrior to be reckoned with," and that "this iconic PlayStation anti-hero will surely not be forgotten." Critics acclaimed Kratos' portrayal in God of War (2018), with many complimenting his more layered and relatable personality compared to previous incarnations. Forbes wrote how "Kratos is a character this time", calling him "fleshed-out" and "surprisingly engaging", while IGN felt that the game "transforms him from the previous games' flat embodiment of the bloodthirsty warrior cliché into someone who can stand shoulder to shoulder with some of my favorite protagonists in recent media". Similarly, Red Bull stated that "This God of War reflects a new, more nuanced Kratos in that it's measured, deep and as mentioned earlier, complex." Engadget, though admitting it was an exaggeration, wrote how "Kratos is more nuanced and shows more emotion in the game's opening hour than he did in the entire previous trilogy". He was ranked as one of the best video game characters of the 2010s by Polygon staff and writer Colin Campbell, particularly his appearance and "In 2018's God of War, he retains his skills as a warrior, but is now a father whose gruff, tough-love approach to parenting belies a touching capacity for love and tenderness toward his son, and a deep grief for his late wife." In its 2010 cover feature, Game Informer also named Kratos as one of 30 characters "who defined a decade".

 
At the 2010 Spike Video Game Awards, Kratos was nominated for "Character of the Year" and awarded the "Biggest Badass" award. He was included in GameSpot's "All Time Greatest Video Game Hero" contest and reached the "Elite Eight" round before losing to Mario. The 2011 Guinness World Records Gamer's Edition lists Kratos as the ninth most popular video game character. In 2011, Empire ranked him as the 15th-greatest video game character. In 2012, GamesRadar ranked Kratos, "one of PlayStation's most popular representatives," as the eighteenth-"most memorable, influential, and badass" protagonist in games: "Being insanely violent isn’t exactly an uncommon trait amongst game characters, but driven by a rage wrought from his guilt (slaughtered thousands, including—oops—his wife and daughter) Kratos kills with such convincing visceral aggression it elevates him way beyond the status of brain-dead murder-bot." In 2010, Game Guru said that "practically anyone, even if they hadn't played any of the God of War games, would know about Kratos."

Kratos has been included on several top video game character lists: GamesRadar listed him as one of the 25 best new characters of the decade, stating that while he appears at first to be a generic character, players eventually learn that he is both an "unstoppable force of nature" and a "broken, tragic man". Knowing of the talks regarding a God of War film, both IGN and UGO Networks listed Kratos as a character who deserved his own movie. In 2008, IGN listed him as one of the characters wanted for an "ultimate fighting" game, featuring characters from all consoles and all eras of gaming. He was included on the list of the best anti-heroes by IGN in 2012. In 2011, Complex listed several of his finishing moves in their fifty "craziest fatalities in video games" list at 30th, 28th, 24th, 14th, and number-one spots for his finishing moves on Hades, Hercules, Helios, the Hydra, and Poseidon, respectively. The "Dairy Bastard" alternate costume from the original God of War was included in UGOs list of the "most stylin' alternate costumes". GameFront listed Kratos in 2011 as one of the top five video game characters with the "biggest daddy issues". Complex ranked him as having the best fighting game cameos for his guest appearances in Soulcalibur: Broken Destiny and Mortal Kombat in 2012 and as the sixth "most badass" video game character of all time in 2013. Kratos' Blades of Chaos were included on GameSpots "15 Most Badass Swords in Video Game History" list. In 2016, Glixel staff ranked Kratos as 3rd most iconic video game character of the 21st century. In 2021, HobbyConsolas included Kratos on their list of "The 30 best heroes of the last 30 years," while Rachel Weber of GamesRadar ranked Kratos as 9th of their "50 iconic video game characters."

On the other hand, Kratos' character has also been given criticism. Prince of Persia producer Ben Mattes said in an interview that he considers Kratos "a supercool character, but it's black and white; his personality is pure rage, his dialogue is pure rage, his character design is pure rage—it's kind of easy." Jeremy "Norm" Scott, creator of the comic strip Hsu and Chan, stated in Electronic Gaming Monthly that Kratos was average and "did not exist, except as an avatar for the player." In 2009, IGN listed Kratos as the sixth-most overrated video game character.

The portrayal of Kratos in 2018's God of War was received favorably by the industry, with new voice actor Christopher Judge earning a BAFTA Award for Performer at the 15th British Academy Games Awards. He was also nominated for Best Performance at The Game Awards 2018. Nick Plessas of Electronic Gaming Monthly (EGM) said the story's most memorable moments were the interactions between Kratos and Atreus. He also noted, "there is often some comic relief to be found when Kratos' curtness and Atreus' charming naivety collide." While he came up short for the award in 2018, Judge would win Best Performance for his role as Kratos in God of War Ragnarök at The Game Awards 2022.

Merchandise and promotion

Two series of action figures based on God of War II have been produced by the National Entertainment Collectibles Association (NECA). The first set included two versions of Kratos; one wielding the Blades of Athena, and the second wearing the Golden Fleece and holding a Gorgon's head. The second set included a twelve-inch figure that plays six game quotes. A second two-figure set was also released, with Kratos wearing the God of War armor. In October 2009, United Cutlery created a scaled replica of Kratos' Blades of Chaos, which included a custom display stand with the God of War logo. Kratos was also featured in a line of action figures released by DC Unlimited and based on God of War III, which included the characters Zeus, Hades, and Hercules. Between February 1, 2010, and March 31, 2010, 7-Eleven sold a limited-edition Slurpee drink called "Kratos Fury", in addition to four exclusive God of War III cups, which featured codes that could be used to access God of War III and Slurpee-themed downloadable content on the Slurpee website. Video game website X-Play filmed a parody music video of Robin Thicke's "Sex Therapy" featuring Kratos and Aphrodite played by Jessica Drake.

Kratos' visage has appeared on the PlayStation Portable Chains of Olympus exclusive bundle pack, and on the PlayStation 3 God of War III sweepstakes prize video game consoles. A limited-edition  figurine of Kratos was the grand prize of a sweepstakes in a promotion for God of War Collection in November 2009. A  figure of Kratos was included in the God of War: Ascension—Collector's Edition. In June 2014, a Kratos Pop! Vinyl Figure was released. The same year, Sony partnered with Gaming Heads to produce a limited-edition (500 units) life-size bust of Kratos. A "Fear Kratos" version of the bust was also produced (100 units) that year, based on the Fear Kratos costume from God of War III. In 2015, Sony again partnered with Gaming Heads to produce a limited-edition (1,250 units) lunging Kratos statue. For the God of War franchise's tenth anniversary (March 2015), Gaming Heads produced two limited-edition "Kratos on the Throne" statues, depicting the final scene of the original God of War. In November 2015, Sony announced a new Kratos statue to be released the following month, which was also in celebration of God of Wars ten-year anniversary.

See also
 Kratos (mythology)
 Fárbauti
 Characters of God of War

Further reading

References

Citations

Bibliography

 
 
 
 
 

Action-adventure game characters
Deity characters in video games
Fantasy video game characters
Fictional Greek people in video games
Fictional archers
Fictional attempted suicides
Fictional axefighters
Fictional characters who committed familicide
Fictional characters with post-traumatic stress disorder
Fictional deicides
Fictional demigods
Fictional Greek people
Fictional chain fighters
Fictional mass murderers
Fictional military personnel in video games
Fictional monster hunters
Fictional pankration practitioners
Fictional soldiers in video games
Fictional swordfighters in video games
Fictional murderers
Fictional war veterans
Fictional warlords
God of War (franchise)
Male characters in video games
Sony Interactive Entertainment protagonists
Spike Video Game Award winners
Video game characters introduced in 2005
Video game characters who use magic
Video game characters with accelerated healing
Video game characters with superhuman strength
Video game mascots
Interactive Achievement Award winners